Roy Dennis (1925 – January 7, 1988) was an American football coach and college athletics administrator. He served as the head football coach at Occidental College from 1945 to 1956, compiling a record of 52–39–4. Dennis also coached basketball, baseball, tennis, swimming, and water polo at Occidental and was the school's athletic director until 1970.

Dennis attended Los Angeles High School in Los Angeles, where he won honors playing football, basketball, and baseball. He then move on to Occidental, where he played football as an end and baseball as a first baseman, winning all-Southern California Conference honors in both sports before graduating in 1933. Dennis joined the coaching staff at his alma mater in the fall of 1934 as assistant football coach under Bill Anderson. The following year he coach the freshman football, basketball, and baseball teams.

Head coaching record

Football

References

External links
 Occidental Hall of Fame profile

1925 births
1988 deaths
American football ends
Baseball first basemen
Occidental Tigers athletic directors
Occidental Tigers baseball players
Occidental Tigers football coaches
Occidental Tigers football players
College men's water polo coaches in the United States
Occidental Tigers men's basketball coaches
College swimming coaches in the United States
College tennis coaches in the United States
Sportspeople from Los Angeles
Coaches of American football from California
Players of American football from Los Angeles
Baseball players from Los Angeles
Baseball coaches from California
Basketball coaches from California
Los Angeles High School alumni
Sports coaches from Los Angeles